A biosphere is the part of a planet's shell where all life occurs.

Biosphere may also refer to:

Music
Biosphere (musician) (born 1962), Norwegian musician
Biosphere (album), an album by Loudness
"Biosphere", a song by In Flames from Subterranean

Other uses
Montreal Biosphère, a geodesic dome in Montreal, Canada 
The Biosphere, a book by Vladimir Vernadsky
Sector 1/Biosphere, an area in Metroid: Other M

See also
Bio-Dome, a film based on the idea
BIOS-3, a man-made biosphere for humans in a closed ecology
Biosphere 2, an artificial closed ecological system in Oracle, Arizona
Biosphere reserve or nature reserve